The year 1889 in archaeology involved some significant events.

Excavations
 Early excavations at Lindholm Høje.
 Birka female Viking warrior in Sweden.
 Excavations in Plataea by the American School of Classical Studies at Athens begin.

Finds
 October – Folkton Drums (decorated Neolithic chalk cylinders) found in a barrow in Yorkshire, England.
 Tauroctony found in Walbrook adjacent to the site of the London Mithraeum.

Births
 January 22 – Umberto Zanotti Bianco, Italian archaeologist, environmentalist and senator (d. 1963)
 July 18 – Axel Boëthius, Swedish-born archaeologist of Etruscan culture (d. 1969)
 August 5 – Rhys Carpenter, American Classical art historian (d. 1980)
 December 1 – Alexander Keiller, Scottish archaeologist of Avebury (d. 1955)

Deaths

References

Archaeology
Archaeology by year
Archaeology
Archaeology